The 21st New York Asian Film Festival began in New York from 15 July with the opening film of the festival Fast and Feel Love, a Thai film by Nawapol Thamrongrattanarit. The 21st edition was celebrated as 20th anniversary of the festival and 
seventy titles were screened in person. The lineup included six world premieres, eight international premieres, 19 North American premieres, four U.S. premieres, and 17 East Coast premieres. The festival closed with Korean sci-fi 2022 film Alienoid by Choi Dong-hoon on 31 July. Mongolian film The Sales Girl by Janchivdorj Sengedorj won the 
Uncaged Award for Best Feature Film.

This year the festival hosted a  fundraising event 'Fight Cancer Night' on July 17, with the proceeds going to the American Cancer Society. Kwon Soo-kyung presented his film Stellar: A Magical Ride, which had its international premiere at the festival.

Screening venues
 Film at Lincoln Center
 Walter Reade Theater
 Asia Society
 725 Park Avenue

Jury 
 Anderson Le: Co-founder of East Films and artistic director of the Hawaii International Film Festival.
 Madeleine Molyneaux: Independent producer and founder, Picture Palace Pictures.
 Jason Gray: Creative producer, Loaded Films, Plan 75.
 Mayu Nakamura: Award-winning filmmaker and principal, Omphalos Pictures.

Films showcase

Films by country or region

Uncaged Award for Best Feature Film Competition
Highlighted title indicates award winner

Awards and winners

Uncaged Award for Best Feature Film

Audience Award

Daniel Craft Award for Excellence in Action Cinema

Star Asia Awards

References

External links
 

Asian-American culture in New York City
Film festivals in New York City
Asian-American film festivals
New York Asian